Harold Griffith (10 October 1879 – 30 May 1947) was an Australian cricketer. He played in five first-class matches for Queensland between 1902 and 1905.

See also
 List of Queensland first-class cricketers

References

External links
 

1879 births
1947 deaths
Australian cricketers
Queensland cricketers
Cricketers from Sydney